Aveh (Âveh), also known as Abeh or Haveh is a city in Qareh Chay Rural District, in the Central District of Saveh County, Markazi Province, Iran. At the 2006 census, its population was 3,558, in 843 families.

History 
Aveh is mentioned by several medieval geographers. Yaqut al-Hamawi, writing in the early 1200s, described Aveh as a small town predominantly inhabited by Shi'ites, leading to conflicts with the predominantly Sunni city of Saveh. In the 1300s, Hamdallah Mustawfi remarked on the city's fortifications and pits for storing ice, while also noting that Aveh's bread was known to be poor.

References

Further reading 
 

Populated places in Saveh County
Cities in Markazi Province